Lasch is a surname. Notable people with the surname include:

Christopher Lasch (1932–1994), American historian, moralist, and social critic
Otto Lasch (1893–1971), German general
Ryan Lasch (born 1987), American hockey player

German-language surnames
Surnames from nicknames